Charles Heywood may refer to:
Charles Heywood (1839–1915), Marine commandant
Charles Heywood (1803–1853), his father, U.S. Navy lieutenant
Charles D. Heywood (1881–1957), U.S. politician
Charles Heywood (baseball), Negro leagues baseball player

See also
Charles Hayward (disambiguation)